Dysgonia hicanora is a moth of the family Noctuidae first described by Turner in 1903. It is found in New Guinea and Fiji.

References

Dysgonia